Daniel Jacques Laperrière (born March 28, 1969) is a Canadian ice hockey coach and former professional ice hockey player. Laperriere played 48 games in the National Hockey League. He is the son of NHL Hall of Famer Jacques Laperrière.

Biography
As a youth, Laperrière played in the 1981 Quebec International Pee-Wee Hockey Tournament with a minor ice hockey team from Laval, Quebec.

He played with the St. Louis Blues and the Ottawa Senators. He graduated from St. Lawrence University where he played for the Skating Saints, earning Hobey Baker Award nomination in 1992.

Laperrière was drafted 93rd overall by St. Louis in the 1989 NHL Entry Draft, and went on to play in 48 regular season games, scoring two goals and five assists for seven points, collecting 27 penalty minutes. 

In 1997, he moved to Germany to play in the Deutsche Eishockey Liga. In five seasons he played for the SERC Wild Wings and Eisbären Berlin. He also spent a season in the 2nd Bundesliga for EV Duisburg. He then spent two seasons in Switzerland's Nationalliga B for HC Ajoie.

He returned to Canada in 2005 to play in the Ligue Nord-Américaine de Hockey for the Saint-Georges CRS Express. He moved to the Arizona Sundogs of the Central Hockey League in 2006 where his 57 points (11 goals and 46 assist) in 60 games was his most productive in his career and was ranked 5th among CHL defencemen in points.

He is currently a pro scout for the Colorado Avalanche.

Awards and honours
List of awards and honours.

References

External links

1969 births
HC Ajoie players
Arizona Sundogs players
Atlanta Knights players
Canadian ice hockey defencemen
Colorado Avalanche scouts
Eisbären Berlin players
Füchse Duisburg players
Sportspeople from Laval, Quebec
Kansas City Blades players
Living people
Ottawa Senators players
Peoria Rivermen (IHL) players
Portland Pirates players
Prince Edward Island Senators players
St. Lawrence Saints men's ice hockey players
St. Louis Blues draft picks
St. Louis Blues players
Schwenninger Wild Wings players
Ice hockey people from Quebec
Canadian expatriate ice hockey players in Germany
AHCA Division I men's ice hockey All-Americans